Borivoj Dovniković (12 December 1930 – 8 February 2022) was a Croatian film director, animator, and caricaturist. He was a prominent member of the Zagreb school of animated films style.

Biography
Dovniković was born in Osijek, Yugoslavia, on 12 December 1930. During the World War II in Yugoslavia and the existence of the Independent State of Croatia Borivoj and his father escaped to Serbia. In 1949, he arrived in Zagreb where he enrolled at the Academy of Fine Arts and started to work as a caricaturist and illustrator in newspapers. Subsequently, he got a job at a local newspaper called Kerempuh in 1950. He participated in the making of the first Croatian animated art film Veliki Miting (The Great Meeting) and, in 1957, he joins the Zagreb Film company, from where he created and worked on animated shorts and movies. This led to the creation of Lutkica (The Doll) in 1961, his first fully own creation. From 1977 to 1982 he was a member of the International Animated Film Association and was a board member of Animafest Zagreb festival. Between 1994 and 2022 Dovniković wrote a comic the "Čipko and Grampa Filip" for youth magazine Bijela pčela published in Rijeka by SKD Prosvjeta.

Dovniković died in Zagreb on 8 February 2022, at the age of 91.

References

External links
 Borivoj Dovniković on Proleksis Encyclopedia

Further reading
 Who's who in Animated Cartoons: An International Guide to Film & Television's Award-winning and Legendary Animators, Jeff Lenburg

1930 births
2022 deaths
Croatian animators
Croatian illustrators
Croatian directors
Croatian animated film directors
People from Osijek
Serbs of Croatia
Burials at Miroševac Cemetery